Paint Rock is a town in and the county seat of Concho County, Texas, United States. The population was 273 at the 2010 census, down from 320 at the 2000 census.

The town's name comes from Indian pictographs painted on cliffs overlooking the nearby Concho River. These pictographs cover nearly half a mile upstream from the town of Paint Rock. Some of the pictures painted on the rocks include animals, human figures, and handprints.

Geography

Paint Rock is located in northern Concho County at  (31.507777, –99.923277), along U.S. Route 83.

Historic literary reference
A chapter titled "An Episode of Paint Rock" is devoted to the town in the 1895 book, A Lone Star Bo-Peep, and Other Tales of Texan Ranch Life written by Howard Seely. The chapter chronicles the week of May 5, 1883, in Paint Rock and features several local residents in the text.

Demographics

2020 census

As of the 2020 United States census, there were 237 people, 109 households, and 94 families residing in the town.

2000 census
As of the census of 2000, 320 people, 110 households, and 83 families resided in the town. The population density was 192.7 people per square mile (74.4/km2). The 126 housing units  averaged 75.9 per square mile (29.3/km2). The racial makeup of the town was 77.19% White, 2.81% Native American, 19.69% from other races, and 0.31% from two or more races. Hispanics or Latinos were 28.44% of the population.

Of the 110 households, 41.8% had children under the age of 18 living with them, 64.5% were married couples living together, 9.1% had a female householder with no husband present, and 24.5% were not families. About 21.8% of all households were made up of individuals, and 9.1% had someone living alone who was 65 years of age or older. The average household size was 2.91 and the average family size was 3.45.

In the town, the population was distributed as 30.6% under the age of 18, 7.8% from 18 to 24, 26.6% from 25 to 44, 21.6% from 45 to 64, and 13.4% who were 65 years of age or older. The median age was 35 years. For every 100 females, there were 86.0 males. For every 100 females age 18 and over, there were 88.1 males.

The median income for a household in the town was $32,500, and for a family was $33,750. Males had a median income of $21,786 versus $21,250 for females. The per capita income for the town was $12,965. About 13.0% of families and 15.9% of the population were below the poverty line, including 24.7% of those under age 18 and 11.1% of those age 65 or over.

Education
The town is served by the Paint Rock Independent School District.

Climate
The climate in this area is characterized by hot, humid summers and generally mild to cool winters. According to the Köppen climate classification system, Paint Rock has a humid subtropical climate, Cfa on climate maps.

References

External links
 Paint Rock in Handbook of Texas Online at the University of North Texas.
  shows key Indian pictograph images with possible links to historical or astronomical events they may record

Towns in Concho County, Texas
Towns in Texas
County seats in Texas